MyColors is a digital distribution platform for themes developed by Stardock. It allows users to skin the Windows graphical user interface. Sets of themes have been made in partnership with GM, Ford, HP, Dell, the NHL, NBA, and NCAA.

MyColors was created so that users could purchase and apply themes without having to worry about the underlying software. The themes are encrypted to reduce piracy. Individual parts can be mixed to create a custom theme with the corresponding Object Desktop software.

MyColors works on Windows XP and above, and is certified for Windows 7.

Skinned elements

Visual styles - WindowBlinds skins that changes the appearance of the window borders, the start-bar and various other UI elements - are used in combination with IconPackager, which changes the appearance of the window icons. A typical icon pack will include custom desktop icons, folder icons and file icons. SoundPackager is usually also used to change the system sounds.

Some themes are bundled with themed desktop applications, like a customized calendar and clock, typically made as DesktopX gadgets. A Windows Media Player skin and a wallpaper may also be supplied.

Theme updates
MyColors checks for updates to a theme and allows users to update the theme. Updated themes may include new functionality, fixes to the visual styles and higher resolution icons.

References

External links
MyColors homepage

Windows-only software
Desktop environments
Stardock software